Gulf State Park is a public recreation area on the Gulf of Mexico in the city of Gulf Shores in southern Baldwin County, Alabama. The state park's  mostly encompass the land behind the Gulf Shores beach community, between Highway 59 and SH 161, with the west end extending further south to a wide beach area. In addition to beaches, the park includes marshland, boggy tea-colored streams, pine forests, and three spring-fed, fresh-water lakes: Lake Shelby, Middle Lake, and Little Lake. The park is managed by the Alabama Department of Conservation and Natural Resources, with park enforcement rangers providing around-the-clock security and enforcing anti-littering regulations.

History
The park's facilities, including cabins and a casino, were built in the 1930s by members of the Civilian Conservation Corps working under the auspices of the Federal government. The park opened in 1939 after ownership of the property was transferred to the state. 

After weathering multiple hurricanes, the park was devastated by Hurricane Ivan in 2004. Major projects undertaken in the wake of the storm saw the construction of a  Gulf of Mexico fishing pier that provides 2,448 feet of fishing space, a 5,000-square-foot swimming pool and splash pad, an interactive nature center, a beach pavilion, and renovation of the campground. 

In 2014, the state announced plans to spend $85 million dollars to further renovate the park. The plans included a $56 million lodge and meeting space to replace the lodge destroyed by Hurricane Ivan. The plans were criticized on grounds that money for the project would come from Deepwater Horizon recovery funds which, critics say, should be used for continued cleanup and improvement of the coastal areas. In October 2014, a lawsuit was filed by the Gulf Restoration Network to block use of the funds for the construction of the lodge. State officials said critics misunderstand the plans. The new facility, called The Lodge at Gulf State Park, opened in 2018.

The park's concessionaire-operated zip-line course was closed in 2016. The park's 18-hole golf course was closed permanently in 2018.

Awards 
In September 2020, Gulf State Park was one of eleven Alabama state parks awarded Tripadvisor’s Traveler’s Choice Award, which recognizes businesses and attractions that earn consistently high user reviews.

Activities and amenities
The park includes  of white sand beaches, a modern campground, and nature trails, both fresh and saltwater fishing and swimming, a lodge and cottages plus campsites for both RVs and tents.

References

External links
Gulf State Park Alabama Department of Conservation and Natural Resources

State parks of Alabama
Protected areas of Baldwin County, Alabama
Protected areas established in 1939
1939 establishments in Alabama
Civilian Conservation Corps in Alabama